The 1967 Pittsburgh Pirates season was the 86th season in franchise history.  The sixth-place Pirates finished at 81–81, 20½ games behind the National League and World Series champion St. Louis Cardinals.

Offseason 
 October 12, 1966: Wilbur Wood was traded by the Pirates to the Chicago White Sox for player to be named. November 28, 1966: Juan Pizarro sent to the Pirates to complete trade.
 October 142, 1966: Jerry Lynch was released by the Pirates.
 October 17, 1966: Bill Short was sold to the Pirates by the Boston Red Sox.
 November 29, 1966: Manny Jiménez was drafted by the Pirates from the Kansas City Athletics in the 1966 minor league draft.
 December 1, 1966: Bob Bailey and Gene Michael were traded by the Pirates to the Los Angeles Dodgers for Maury Wills.
 December 6, 1966: Don Cardwell and Don Bosch were traded by the Pirates to the New York Mets for Dennis Ribant and Gary Kolb.

Regular season

Season standings

Record vs. opponents

Game log 

|- bgcolor="ccffcc"
| 1 || April 11 || @ Mets || 6–3 || Veale (1–0) || Cardwell || Mikkelsen (1) || 31,510 || 1–0
|- bgcolor="ffbbbb"
| 2 || April 13 || @ Mets || 2–3 || Estrada || Law (0–1) || Taylor || 5,005 || 1–1
|- bgcolor="ffbbbb"
| 3 || April 14 || Cubs || 5–8 || Simmons || Ribant (0–1) || — || 32,296 || 1–2
|- bgcolor="ffbbbb"
| 4 || April 15 || Cubs || 3–7 || Culp || Sisk (0–1) || — || 10,624 || 1–3
|- bgcolor="ccffcc"
| 5 || April 16 || Cubs || 6–5 || Pizarro (1–0) || Upham || — || 13,510 || 2–3
|- bgcolor="ffbbbb"
| 6 || April 17 || Mets || 6–9 || Cardwell || Law (0–2) || Taylor || 7,599 || 2–4
|- bgcolor="ccffcc"
| 7 || April 21 || @ Cubs || 6–1 || Veale (2–0) || Culp || — || 2,974 || 3–4
|- bgcolor="ffbbbb"
| 8 || April 23 || @ Cubs || 3–7 || Jenkins || Pizarro (1–1) || — || 6,754 || 3–5
|- bgcolor="ccffcc"
| 9 || April 25 || Phillies || 7–3 || O'Dell (1–0) || Bunning || — || 5,585 || 4–5
|- bgcolor="ccffcc"
| 10 || April 27 || Phillies || 5–4 || Mikkelsen (1–0) || Hall || Short (1) || 4,979 || 5–5
|- bgcolor="ccffcc"
| 11 || April 28 || @ Cardinals || 6–2 || Veale (3–0) || Washburn || — || 45,565 || 6–5
|- bgcolor="ccffcc"
| 12 || April 30 || @ Cardinals || 2–0 || Pizarro (2–1) || Jaster || — || 20,017 || 7–5
|-

|- bgcolor="ccffcc"
| 13 || May 1 || @ Cardinals || 8–5 || O'Dell (2–0) || Jackson || Face (1) || 13,707 || 8–5
|- bgcolor="ffbbbb"
| 14 || May 2 || Dodgers || 3–5 (11) || Regan || Blass (0–1) || Perranoski || 5,762 || 8–6
|- bgcolor="ccffcc"
| 15 || May 3 || Dodgers || 6–5 (15) || Pizarro (3–1) || Singer || — || 9,124 || 9–6
|- bgcolor="ccffcc"
| 16 || May 4 || Dodgers || 9–3 || Veale (4–0) || Egan || Mikkelsen (2) || 9,603 || 10–6
|- bgcolor="ccffcc"
| 17 || May 5 || Giants || 7–2 || Sisk (1–1) || Bolin || — || 18,294 || 11–6
|- bgcolor="ccffcc"
| 18 || May 6 || Giants || 6–5 (10) || Face (1–0) || Linzy || — || 7,662 || 12–6
|- bgcolor="ffbbbb"
| 19 || May 8 || Cardinals || 5–6 (10) || Willis || Law (0–3) || Jaster || 5,388 || 12–7
|- bgcolor="ffbbbb"
| 20 || May 9 || Cardinals || 3–6 || Carlton || Fryman (0–1) || Hoerner || 4,951 || 12–8
|- bgcolor="ccffcc"
| 21 || May 10 || Cardinals || 4–1 || Veale (5–0) || Hughes || Face (2) || 8,466 || 13–8
|- bgcolor="ffbbbb"
| 22 || May 11 || Braves || 2–9 || Bruce || Sisk (1–2) || — || 4,885 || 13–9
|- bgcolor="ccffcc"
| 23 || May 12 || Braves || 5–2 || O'Dell (3–0) || Jarvis || Face (3) || 12,920 || 14–9
|- bgcolor="ccffcc"
| 24 || May 13 || Braves || 6–5 (10) || Face (2–0) || Niekro || — || 8,156 || 15–9
|- bgcolor="ccffcc"
| 25 || May 14 || Braves || 5–2 || Ribant (1–1) || Kelley || Face (4) || 26,071 || 16–9
|- bgcolor="ffbbbb"
| 26 || May 15 || @ Reds || 7–8 (10) || Arrigo || Pizarro (3–2) || — || 5,222 || 16–10
|- bgcolor="ffbbbb"
| 27 || May 16 || @ Reds || 3–6 || Queen || Fryman (0–2) || — || 13,389 || 16–11
|- bgcolor="ffbbbb"
| 28 || May 17 || @ Reds || 1–3 || Ellis || Sisk (1–3) || — || 13,159 || 16–12
|- bgcolor="ccffcc"
| 29 || May 18 || @ Braves || 5–3 || O'Dell (4–0) || Carroll || Face (5) || 14,092 || 17–12
|- bgcolor="ffbbbb"
| 30 || May 19 || @ Braves || 2–3 || Lemaster || Ribant (1–2) || — || 20,603 || 17–13
|- bgcolor="ccffcc"
| 31 || May 20 || @ Braves || 6–2 || Veale (6–0) || Kelley || McBean (1) || 33,883 || 18–13
|- bgcolor="ffbbbb"
| 32 || May 21 || @ Braves || 2–7 || Johnson || Pizarro (3–3) || — || 23,221 || 18–14
|- bgcolor="ccffcc"
| 33 || May 22 || @ Astros || 3–1 || Sisk (2–3) || Zachary || — || 10,613 || 19–14
|- bgcolor="ffbbbb"
| 34 || May 23 || @ Astros || 3–8 || Dierker || O'Dell (4–1) || Schneider || 10,572 || 19–15
|- bgcolor="ccffcc"
| 35 || May 24 || @ Astros || 7–4 || Face (3–0) || Latman || — || 13,140 || 20–15
|- bgcolor="ccffcc"
| 36 || May 26 || Reds || 6–5 (12) || McBean (1–0) || Osteen || — || 24,358 || 21–15
|- bgcolor="ffbbbb"
| 37 || May 27 || Reds || 1–6 || Pappas || Pizarro (3–4) || — || 28,179 || 21–16
|- bgcolor="ccffcc"
| 38 || May 28 || Reds || 3–2 || Sisk (3–3) || Nottebart || Face (6) || 31,778 || 22–16
|- bgcolor="ffbbbb"
| 39 || May 30 || Astros || 2–3 || Wilson || Ribant (1–3) || — ||  || 22–17
|- bgcolor="ccffcc"
| 40 || May 30 || Astros || 4–3 || Face (4–0) || Sembera || — || 32,986 || 23–17
|- bgcolor="ffbbbb"
| 41 || May 31 || @ Giants || 4–15 || Herbel || Veale (6–1) || Linzy || 7,393 || 23–18
|-

|- bgcolor="ffbbbb"
| 42 || June 1 || @ Giants || 1–7 || Perry || Pizarro (3–5) || — || 7,000 || 23–19
|- bgcolor="ccffcc"
| 43 || June 2 || @ Dodgers || 5–3 || Blass (1–1) || Regan || Face (7) || 35,540 || 24–19
|- bgcolor="ffbbbb"
| 44 || June 3 || @ Dodgers || 1–5 || Sutton || O'Dell (4–2) || — || 39,621 || 24–20
|- bgcolor="ccffcc"
| 45 || June 4 || @ Dodgers || 4–1 || Veale (7–1) || Drysdale || Face (8) || 39,741 || 25–20
|- bgcolor="ffbbbb"
| 46 || June 6 || Mets || 0–1 (10) || Shaw || Face (4–1) || — ||  || 25–21
|- bgcolor="ffbbbb"
| 47 || June 6 || Mets || 2–3 (10) || Hamilton || Face (4–2) || — || 16,712 || 25–22
|- bgcolor="ccffcc"
| 48 || June 7 || Mets || 3–0 || Sisk (4–3) || Fisher || — || 7,979 || 26–22
|- bgcolor="ccffcc"
| 49 || June 9 || Phillies || 16–1 || O'Dell (5–2) || Wise || — || 17,064 || 27–22
|- bgcolor="ccffcc"
| 50 || June 10 || Phillies || 4–3 || McBean (2–0) || Hall || — || 17,587 || 28–22
|- bgcolor="ffbbbb"
| 51 || June 11 || Phillies || 1–14 || Bunning || Pizarro (3–6) || — || 15,915 || 28–23
|- bgcolor="ccffcc"
| 52 || June 12 || Cardinals || 7–5 || Ribant (2–3) || Carlton || Face (9) || 10,964 || 29–23
|- bgcolor="ffbbbb"
| 53 || June 13 || Cardinals || 4–7 || Hughes || Sisk (4–4) || Hoerner || 14,325 || 29–24
|- bgcolor="ffbbbb"
| 54 || June 14 || Cardinals || 4–7 || Gibson || O'Dell (5–3) || — || 14,217 || 29–25
|- bgcolor="ffbbbb"
| 55 || June 15 || @ Phillies || 1–4 || Hall || Veale (7–2) || — ||  || 29–26
|- bgcolor="ccffcc"
| 56 || June 15 || @ Phillies || 5–2 || Blass (2–1) || Ellsworth || — || 24,480 || 30–26
|- bgcolor="ffbbbb"
| 57 || June 16 || @ Phillies || 3–5 || Jackson || O'Dell (5–4) || — || 20,796 || 30–27
|- bgcolor="ccffcc"
| 58 || June 17 || @ Phillies || 6–5 || Ribant (3–3) || Bunning || Face (10) || 9,595 || 31–27
|- bgcolor="ccffcc"
| 59 || June 18 || @ Phillies || 5–3 || Sisk (5–4) || Wise || Pizarro (1) || 14,726 || 32–27
|- bgcolor="ccffcc"
| 60 || June 19 || Cubs || 4–3 || Veale (8–2) || Jenkins || McBean (2) || 12,224 || 33–27
|- bgcolor="ffbbbb"
| 61 || June 20 || Cubs || 3–5 || Hartenstein || Blass (2–2) || — || 12,393 || 33–28
|- bgcolor="ffbbbb"
| 62 || June 21 || Cubs || 3–6 || Simmons || O'Dell (5–5) || Radatz || 11,870 || 33–29
|- bgcolor="ccffcc"
| 63 || June 23 || @ Reds || 4–2 || Ribant (4–3) || Abernathy || McBean (3) || 25,227 || 34–29
|- bgcolor="ffbbbb"
| 64 || June 24 || @ Reds || 4–6 || Nolan || Sisk (5–5) || Lee || 28,312 || 34–30
|- bgcolor="ccffcc"
| 65 || June 25 || @ Reds || 5–4 || Veale (9–2) || Pappas || Pizarro (2) || 23,673 || 35–30
|- bgcolor="ffbbbb"
| 66 || June 26 || @ Mets || 2–3 || Taylor || Face (4–3) || — || 27,294 || 35–31
|- bgcolor="ffbbbb"
| 67 || June 27 || @ Mets || 2–5 || Selma || Fryman (0–3) || — || 18,167 || 35–32
|- bgcolor="ffbbbb"
| 68 || June 28 || @ Cubs || 2–4 || Jenkins || Ribant (4–4) || — ||  || 35–33
|- bgcolor="ffbbbb"
| 69 || June 28 || @ Cubs || 1–3 || Culp || Sisk (5–6) || — || 22,731 || 35–34
|- bgcolor="ffbbbb"
| 70 || June 29 || @ Cubs || 3–4 || Niekro || McBean (2–1) || Hartenstein || 16,415 || 35–35
|- bgcolor="ccffcc"
| 71 || June 30 || Braves || 3–1 || Blass (3–2) || Carroll || — || 15,988 || 36–35
|-

|- bgcolor="ffbbbb"
| 72 || July 1 || Braves || 2–4 || Raymond || Mikkelsen (1–1) || — || 9,353 || 36–36
|- bgcolor="ccffcc"
| 73 || July 3 || Dodgers || 5–2 || Sisk (6–6) || Drysdale || — || 12,321 || 37–36
|- bgcolor="ccffcc"
| 74 || July 4 || Dodgers || 9–7 || Face (5–3) || Miller || — || 9,080 || 38–36
|- bgcolor="ffbbbb"
| 75 || July 5 || Dodgers || 3–5 || Sutton || Blass (3–3) || — || 12,821 || 38–37
|- bgcolor="ffbbbb"
| 76 || July 7 || Reds || 2–6 || Ellis || Veale (9–3) || — || 19,805 || 38–38
|- bgcolor="ccffcc"
| 77 || July 8 || Reds || 6–1 || Sisk (7–6) || Arrigo || — || 11,182 || 39–38
|- bgcolor="ccffcc"
| 78 || July 9 || Reds || 2–1 || Ribant (5–4) || Maloney || — || 25,934 || 40–38
|- bgcolor="ffbbbb"
| 79 || July 12 || @ Cardinals || 3–4 || Jackson || Mikkelsen (1–2) || — || 14,812 || 40–39
|- bgcolor="ccffcc"
| 80 || July 13 || @ Cardinals || 8–5 || Veale (10–3) || Carlton || McBean (4) || 24,134 || 41–39
|- bgcolor="ffbbbb"
| 81 || July 14 || @ Cardinals || 1–2 || Jaster || Sisk (7–7) || Hoerner || 25,668 || 41–40
|- bgcolor="ccffcc"
| 82 || July 15 || @ Cardinals || 6–4 || Pizarro (4–6) || Briles || Face (11) || 39,440 || 42–40
|- bgcolor="ffbbbb"
| 83 || July 16 || @ Braves || 1–2 || Niekro || Law (0–4) || — || 35,204 || 42–41
|- bgcolor="ffbbbb"
| 84 || July 17 || @ Braves || 2–6 || Johnson || Veale (10–4) || — || 18,220 || 42–42
|- bgcolor="ccffcc"
| 85 || July 18 || Giants || 8–6 || Blass (4–3) || Marichal || Face (12) ||  || 43–42
|- bgcolor="ffbbbb"
| 86 || July 18 || Giants || 2–3 || Gibbon || O'Dell (5–6) || Linzy || 28,023 || 43–43
|- bgcolor="ccffcc"
| 87 || July 19 || Giants || 2–1 (11) || Ribant (6–4) || McCormick || — || 16,013 || 44–43
|- bgcolor="ffbbbb"
| 88 || July 20 || Giants || 1–6 || Perry || Law (0–5) || — || 10,359 || 44–44
|- bgcolor="ccffcc"
| 89 || July 21 || Astros || 9–1 || Veale (11–4) || Blasingame || — || 14,687 || 45–44
|- bgcolor="ccffcc"
| 90 || July 22 || Astros || 15–2 || Fryman (1–3) || Belinsky || — || 9,597 || 46–44
|- bgcolor="ffbbbb"
| 91 || July 23 || Astros || 5–8 || Giusti || Blass (4–4) || Sherry ||  || 46–45
|- bgcolor="ccffcc"
| 92 || July 23 || Astros || 15–2 || Sisk (8–7) || Latman || — || 22,925 || 47–45
|- bgcolor="ffbbbb"
| 93 || July 24 || @ Dodgers || 3–4 || Regan || Face (5–4) || — || 22,495 || 47–46
|- bgcolor="ffbbbb"
| 94 || July 25 || @ Dodgers || 1–3 || Singer || Law (0–6) || — || 24,348 || 47–47
|- bgcolor="ccffcc"
| 95 || July 26 || @ Dodgers || 4–2 || Veale (12–4) || Sutton || Pizarro (3) || 24,772 || 48–47
|- bgcolor="ffbbbb"
| 96 || July 27 || @ Astros || 4–5 || Latman || McBean (2–2) || — || 17,229 || 48–48
|- bgcolor="ffbbbb"
| 97 || July 28 || @ Astros || 3–9 || Giusti || Sisk (8–8) || — || 20,909 || 48–49
|- bgcolor="ffbbbb"
| 98 || July 29 || @ Astros || 5–6 || Eilers || Pizarro (4–7) || Sherry || 25,785 || 48–50
|- bgcolor="ccffcc"
| 99 || July 30 || @ Giants || 4–3 || Law (1–6) || Sadecki || Face (13) || 32,209 || 49–50
|- bgcolor="ffbbbb"
| 100 || July 31 || @ Giants || 4–8 || McCormick || Pizarro (4–8) || Linzy || 8,683 || 49–51
|-

|- bgcolor="ffbbbb"
| 101 || August 1 || @ Giants || 1–3 || Marichal || Fryman (1–4) || — || 15,501 || 49–52
|- bgcolor="ffbbbb"
| 102 || August 2 || @ Giants || 2–7 || Perry || Ribant (6–5) || — || 11,654 || 49–53
|- bgcolor="ccffcc"
| 103 || August 4 || Dodgers || 3–2 (10) || Pizarro (5–8) || Miller || — || 13,474 || 50–53
|- bgcolor="ccffcc"
| 104 || August 5 || Dodgers || 2–1 || Law (2–6) || Regan || — || 9,658 || 51–53
|- bgcolor="ffbbbb"
| 105 || August 6 || Dodgers || 4–5 || Osteen || Sisk (8–9) || Perranoski || 12,384 || 51–54
|- bgcolor="ccffcc"
| 106 || August 7 || @ Cubs || 6–3 || Face (6–4) || Hartenstein || — ||  || 52–54
|- bgcolor="ffffff"
| 107 || August 7 || @ Cubs || 3–3 (14) ||  ||  || — || 11,482 || 52–54
|- bgcolor="ffbbbb"
| 108 || August 8 || @ Cubs || 4–8 || Niekro || Gelnar (0–1) || — || 9,412 || 52–55
|- bgcolor="ffbbbb"
| 109 || August 9 || @ Cubs || 0–6 || Jenkins || Veale (12–5) || — ||  || 52–56
|- bgcolor="ccffcc"
| 110 || August 9 || @ Cubs || 10–6 || McBean (3–2) || Stoneman || — || 16,822 || 53–56
|- bgcolor="ccffcc"
| 111 || August 10 || @ Mets || 3–0 || Sisk (9–9) || Fisher || — || 20,572 || 54–56
|- bgcolor="ffbbbb"
| 112 || August 11 || @ Mets || 2–3 || Frisella || Ribant (6–6) || Shaw || 29,202 || 54–57
|- bgcolor="ffbbbb"
| 113 || August 12 || @ Mets || 1–6 || Koonce || Fryman (1–5) || — || 20,181 || 54–58
|- bgcolor="ffbbbb"
| 114 || August 13 || @ Mets || 0–3 || Seaver || Blass (4–5) || — ||  || 54–59
|- bgcolor="ffbbbb"
| 115 || August 13 || @ Mets || 9–11 || Shaw || McBean (3–3) || Taylor || 34,122 || 54–60
|- bgcolor="ccffcc"
| 116 || August 14 || Reds || 4–3 || Veale (13–5) || Nolan || Face (14) || 8,414 || 55–60
|- bgcolor="ffbbbb"
| 117 || August 15 || Reds || 1–2 || Abernathy || Sisk (9–10) || — || 9,237 || 55–61
|- bgcolor="ffbbbb"
| 118 || August 16 || Reds || 0–4 || Maloney || Fryman (1–6) || McCool || 9,116 || 55–62
|- bgcolor="ffbbbb"
| 119 || August 17 || Mets || 5–6 || Cardwell || Pizarro (5–9) || — ||  || 55–63
|- bgcolor="ccffcc"
| 120 || August 17 || Mets || 6–5 (14) || Pizarro (6–9) || Seaver || — || 9,213 || 56–63
|- bgcolor="ccffcc"
| 121 || August 18 || Mets || 7–2 || Veale (14–5) || Fisher || — || 6,628 || 57–63
|- bgcolor="ccffcc"
| 122 || August 19 || Mets || 6–5 || Sisk (10–10) || Taylor || — || 7,570 || 58–63
|- bgcolor="ccffcc"
| 123 || August 20 || Mets || 4–2 || Pizarro (7–9) || Selma || Face (15) || 7,263 || 59–63
|- bgcolor="ccffcc"
| 124 || August 21 || Cubs || 5–1 || Fryman (2–6) || Jenkins || Face (16) || 7,794 || 60–63
|- bgcolor="ffbbbb"
| 125 || August 22 || Cubs || 1–8 || Niekro || Veale (14–6) || — || 8,414 || 60–64
|- bgcolor="ccffcc"
| 126 || August 23 || Cubs || 2–1 || McBean (4–3) || Hands || — || 8,952 || 61–64
|- bgcolor="ffbbbb"
| 127 || August 25 || @ Phillies || 0–2 || Bunning || Sisk (10–11) || — ||  || 61–65
|- bgcolor="ffbbbb"
| 128 || August 25 || @ Phillies || 2–6 || Short || Blass (4–6) || Farrell || 13,696 || 61–66
|- bgcolor="ffbbbb"
| 129 || August 26 || @ Phillies || 0–1 || Wise || Veale (14–7) || — || 16,454 || 61–67
|- bgcolor="ffbbbb"
| 130 || August 27 || @ Phillies || 0–2 (5) || Jackson || Fryman (2–7) || — || 10,953 || 61–68
|- bgcolor="ccffcc"
| 131 || August 28 || @ Braves || 4–3 (10) || Ribant (7–6) || Ritchie || Pizarro (4) || 8,725 || 62–68
|- bgcolor="ffbbbb"
| 132 || August 29 || @ Braves || 3–7 || Niekro || Ribant (7–7) || Upshaw || 6,516 || 62–69
|- bgcolor="ccffcc"
| 133 || August 30 || @ Braves || 11–9 || Ribant (8–7) || Carroll || Face (17) || 8,674 || 63–69
|- bgcolor="ccffcc"
| 134 || August 31 || Phillies || 6–4 || Veale (15–7) || Hall || Pizarro (5) || 3,406 || 64–69
|-

|- bgcolor="ccffcc"
| 135 || September 1 || Phillies || 3–0 || Fryman (3–7) || Jackson || — || 6,113 || 65–69
|- bgcolor="ccffcc"
| 136 || September 2 || Phillies || 9–1 || McBean (5–3) || Bunning || — || 6,431 || 66–69
|- bgcolor="ffbbbb"
| 137 || September 3 || Phillies || 2–7 || Short || Sisk (10–12) || Farrell || 7,164 || 66–70
|- bgcolor="ccffcc"
| 138 || September 4 || @ Cardinals || 10–8 || Ribant (9–7) || Lamabe || Pizarro (6) ||  || 67–70
|- bgcolor="ccffcc"
| 139 || September 4 || @ Cardinals || 9–3 || Blass (5–6) || Washburn || Pizarro (7) || 43,960 || 68–70
|- bgcolor="ffbbbb"
| 140 || September 6 || Braves || 1–4 || Lemaster || Fryman (3–8) || — ||  || 68–71
|- bgcolor="ccffcc"
| 141 || September 6 || Braves || 4–1 || McBean (6–3) || Jarvis || — || 6,849 || 69–71
|- bgcolor="ccffcc"
| 142 || September 7 || Braves || 4–2 || Sisk (11–12) || Niekro || Pizarro (8) || 3,990 || 70–71
|- bgcolor="ccffcc"
| 143 || September 8 || Cardinals || 4–3 (10) || Dal Canton (1–0) || Willis || — || 9,637 || 71–71
|- bgcolor="ffbbbb"
| 144 || September 9 || Cardinals || 0–6 || Carlton || Blass (5–7) || — || 6,446 || 71–72
|- bgcolor="ccffcc"
| 145 || September 10 || Cardinals || 8–7 || Pizarro (8–9) || Hoerner || Sisk (1) || 8,920 || 72–72
|- bgcolor="ffbbbb"
| 146 || September 11 || @ Reds || 3–4 || Davidson || Pizarro (8–10) || — || 4,150 || 72–73
|- bgcolor="ffbbbb"
| 147 || September 12 || @ Reds || 7–15 || Lee || Veale (15–8) || Nottebart || 4,605 || 72–74
|- bgcolor="ccffcc"
| 148 || September 13 || @ Reds || 11–3 || Sisk (12–12) || Queen || — || 4,966 || 73–74
|- bgcolor="ffbbbb"
| 149 || September 15 || Giants || 3–6 || Perry || Blass (5–8) || — || 6,332 || 73–75
|- bgcolor="ccffcc"
| 150 || September 16 || Giants || 5–4 (16) || Dal Canton (2–0) || McCormick || — || 5,056 || 74–75
|- bgcolor="ccffcc"
| 151 || September 17 || Giants || 5–4 || McBean (7–3) || Linzy || — || 5,733 || 75–75
|- bgcolor="ffbbbb"
| 152 || September 18 || @ Astros || 4–14 || Giusti || Sisk (12–13) || — || 6,327 || 75–76
|- bgcolor="ccffcc"
| 153 || September 19 || @ Astros || 11–7 || Face (7–4) || Sherry || Pizarro (9) || 5,321 || 76–76
|- bgcolor="ffbbbb"
| 154 || September 20 || @ Astros || 4–5 || House || Ribant (9–8) || — || 4,629 || 76–77
|- bgcolor="ffbbbb"
| 155 || September 22 || @ Giants || 0–1 || Sadecki || McBean (7–4) || — || 10,238 || 76–78
|- bgcolor="ffbbbb"
| 156 || September 23 || @ Giants || 4–8 || McDaniel || Face (7–5) || Linzy || 12,431 || 76–79
|- bgcolor="ccffcc"
| 157 || September 24 || @ Giants || 2–1 || Blass (6–8) || Perry || Fryman (1) || 16,123 || 77–79
|- bgcolor="ccffcc"
| 158 || September 25 || @ Dodgers || 2–1 (11) || Shellenback (1–0) || Regan || — || 11,983 || 78–79
|- bgcolor="ffbbbb"
| 159 || September 26 || @ Dodgers || 1–3 || Drysdale || Dal Canton (2–1) || Perranoski || 12,486 || 78–80
|- bgcolor="ccffcc"
| 160 || September 27 || @ Dodgers || 1–0 || Veale (16–8) || Foster || — || 12,467 || 79–80
|- bgcolor="ccffcc"
| 161 || September 29 || Astros || 4–1 || Moose (1–0) || Blasingame || — || 1,951 || 80–80
|- bgcolor="ffbbbb"
| 162 || September 30 || Astros || 3–4 || Coombs || Shellenback (1–1) || — || 2,109 || 80–81
|-

|- bgcolor="ccffcc"
| 163 || October 1 || Astros || 10–3 || Sisk (13–13) || Von Hoff || — || 28,244 || 81–81
|-

|-
| Legend:       = Win       = Loss       = TieBold = Pirates team member

Opening Day lineup

Notable transactions 
 June 6, 1967: Richie Zisk was drafted by the Pirates in the 3rd round of the 1967 Major League Baseball Draft.
 June 21, 1967: Al Luplow was acquired by the Pirates from the New York Mets via waivers.
 July 18, 1967: Pirates fire Manager Harry Walker. Danny Murtaugh is named interim Manager.
 August 4, 1967: Pete Mikkelsen claimed on waivers by Chicago Cubs from the Pirates.

Roster

Statistics 
Batting
Note: G = Games played; AB = At bats; H = Hits; Avg. = Batting average; HR = Home runs; RBI = Runs batted in

Pitching
Note: G = Games pitched; IP = Innings pitched; W = Wins; L = Losses; ERA = Earned run average; SO = Strikeouts

Farm system

Notes

References 
 1967 Pittsburgh Pirates team page at Baseball Reference
 1967 Pittsburgh Pirates Page at Baseball Almanac

Pittsburgh Pirates seasons
Pittsburgh Pirates season
Pittsburgh Pirates